Elkins Park is an unincorporated community in Montgomery County, Pennsylvania, United States. The community is four station stops from Center City on Septa Regional Rail. It was listed as a census-designated place prior to the 2020 census.

Historically, Elkins Park was home to Philadelphia's early 20th century business elite, among them John B. Stetson, John Wanamaker, Henry W. Breyer, Jay Cooke, William Lukens Elkins and Peter A.B. Widener. In the later 20th century, it was home to Ralph J. Roberts, co-founder of Comcast, as well as to the Gimbels family, founders of the department store chain.

Today, it remains home to many gilded age mansions such as Lynnewood Hall, a 110-room, neoclassical estate, the Elkins Estate presently being restored as a hotel-spa, distillery and events center and the Henry West Breyer Sr. House, the former residence of the ice cream magnate which now serves as the Cheltenham Township Municipal building.

In 2018, New York Magazine described Elkins Park as "an old, elegant neighborhood of close-clustered homes". It is notable for its varied architectural styles (among them: Modern, American colonial and Dutch colonial, Queen Anne, English Cottage and Tudor) its wealth of homes designed by renowned 19th and 20th century architects such as Horace Trumbauer, Louis Kahn and Robert A.M. Stern and its diversity of religious institutions. With six synagogues it also makes up the foundation of the "Old York Road Corridor" of the Philadelphia area Jewish community, supported by the approximately 25,000 Jews in the Cheltenham-Jenkintown-Abington region. Seasonally Elkins Park hosts a variety of religious and cultural festivals such as the "Taste of Greece" food festival, the Romanian food festival, the Serbian food festival, various Jewish festivals such as a multi-congregation Purim celebration, and arts festivals like "Arts in the Park".

Though distinct communities, the neighborhoods of Melrose Park and historic La Mott share a postal code with Elkins Park.

Demographics

Points of interest

 Beth Sholom Synagogue, the only synagogue designed by Frank Lloyd Wright
 Elkins Estate, former family summer home of Pennsylvania Railroad Company magnate William L. Elkins
 High School Park, an 11-acre park with four distinct ecosystems, was the original grounds of Cheltenham High School and became a township park in 1996 after the building burned down
 Lynnewood Hall, a 110-room, Gilded Age mansion
 St. Paul's Episcopal Church, added to the National Register of Historic Places in 1982
 Richard Wall House Museum, a house listed on State and National Registers of Historic Places, had the distinction of being the oldest Pennsylvania house in continuous residence until rehabilitation work began, now a museum

Government
Elkins Park is split between Cheltenham and Abington Townships in the suburbs outside of Philadelphia. It is represented by Madeleine Dean in Pennsylvania's 4th congressional district.

Schools
The portion in Cheltenham Township is zoned to Cheltenham Township School District.
Myers Elementary School (Kindergarten through 5th grade)
Lynnwood Elementary School (now closed and converted into an administrative building); served as an elementary school from February 1951 through 1977
Elkins Park School (5th and 6th grade)
Cedarbrook Middle School (7th and 8th grade)
Cheltenham High School (9th grade  through 12th grade)

The portion in Abington Township is zoned to Abington School District.
McKinley Elementary School (Kindergarten through 5th grade)
Abington Middle School (6th grade through 8th grade)
Abington High School (9th grade through 12th grade)

Private:
Perelman Jewish Day School
Mesivta Yesodei Yisroel of Elkins Park
Wyncote Academy
Robert Saligman Middle School (closed in 2012)
St. James Catholic School (closed)

Tertiary:
Alvernia University's Philadelphia campus
Gratz College
Salus University
The former campus of the Tyler School of Art, the art school of Temple University. The site is currently being developed as "a center for artists and architects" for Creatio International.
Settlement Music School

Transportation

Public transportation
Elkins Park is served by SEPTA Regional Rail trains on the Glenside Line, Warminster Line, West Trenton Line and Lansdale/Doylestown Line at the Elkins Park station.  The Jenkintown and Melrose Park stations are also found near the neighborhood of Elkins Park, and are served by the same regional rail lines. SEPTA bus routes 28, 55, 70 and 77 also provide service to Elkins Park.

Road
Toward the western end of Elkins Park is Pennsylvania Route 611 (Old York Road).  In Elkins Park, Pennsylvania Route 73 runs along Township Line Road, mostly marking the border between Cheltenham and Abington townships.

Locale

Notable people

Wilt Chamberlain, American professional basketball player who played center and is widely regarded as one of the greatest players in the sport's history, lived in Elkins Park
Laurie Halse Anderson, American writer, lived in Elkins Park
Jay Ansill, composer and folk musician
Jenna Arnold, American businessperson, author, and a national organizer for the Women's March on Washington
Melissa Bank, American author, grew up in Elkins Park
Jan Berenstain and Stan Berenstain, writers and illustrators best known for creating the children's book series The Berenstain Bears
Michael S. Brown, Nobel prize winner in medicine or physiology
Ilene Chaiken, American television producer, director, writer, and founder of Little Chicken Productions
Bill Cosby,  Stand-up comedian, actor, and author.
Douglas Feith, former Under Secretary of Defense for Policy, grew up in Elkins Park
Marvin Harrison, NFL wide-receiver for the Indianapolis Colts
Lil Dicky, rapper and comedian
William Lukens Elkins, oil and transport magnate
William McIntire Elkins, rare book collector
Mark Levin, radio talk show host
Edgar Lee Masters, poet; spent his final years in Elkins Park
Mary Ellen Mark, photojournalist
Benjamin Netanyahu, Prime Minister of Israel
Yonatan Netanyahu, Israeli soldier and brother of Benjamin Netanyahu
Raymond Perelman, American businessman and philanthropist 
Ralph J. Roberts, co-founder of Comcast; father of current Comcast chief executive officer, Brian L. Roberts
Jeffrey Solow, classical cellist and academic
Richard Suckle, American film producer. Suckle was one of several producers nominated for an Academy Award for Best Picture for the 2013 film American Hustle
Eleanor Elkins Widener, founder of Widener Library to honor her son
Harry Elkins Widener, grandson of Peter A. B. Widener and namesake of Widener Library at Harvard University; born in Elkins Park and died on the Titanic
Peter A. B. Widener, head of a wealthy and historically prominent family
Bernard Wolfman, Dean of the University of Pennsylvania Law School
Ike Richman, personal attorney for National Basketball Association player Wilt Chamberlain and a co-owner of the Philadelphia 76ers

In popular culture
In the AMC period drama television series Mad Men, the character Betty Draper was raised in the "tiny Philadelphia suburb of Elkins Park, Pennsylvania".  During the show's second season, Betty's father has a series of strokes, and is taken to "Elkins Park Hospital". This would have actually been the former Rolling Hill Hospital, which opened in 1953, and is now known as MossRehab and Einstein at Elkins Park, part of the Einstein Healthcare Network.

Ann Patchett's 2019 novel The Dutch House is primarily set in Elkins Park.

See also

References

 George, John (November 10, 2003). "Einstein Rehabs Hospital".  Philadelphia Business Journal.  Retrieved December 31, 2015.

External links

Abington Township Website
Cheltenham Township Website
School District of Abington Township Website
School District of Cheltenham Township Website
Southeastern Pennsylvania Transportation Authority Official Website

 
Unincorporated communities in Montgomery County, Pennsylvania
Unincorporated communities in Pennsylvania